The Frank H. Woods Telephone Museum is located at 2047 "M" Street in Lincoln, Nebraska. Its goal is to educate the general public about the history of the telephone industry. The museum was featured in the 2008 Film Yes Man starring Jim Carrey. The museum opened in October 1996 with grant by the Independent Telephone Pioneers Association and funding and support from Aliant Communications. The museum is named in honor of the founder of the Lincoln Telephone Company.

At the beginning of 2016, it was announced that the future of the Telephone Museum was in question.  Windstream Communications, the owner of the property the museum sat on, was ending the museum's lease on March 31 since the property was within the footprint of "The Telegraph District" redevelopment.  Sometime thereafter during an interview with the Lincoln Journal Star, a co-developer of the redevelopment district, Speedway Properties, expressed an interest to work with the museum.  The museum held its last day and permanently closed on July 29, 2018, with the fate of the collection still unclear.

References

External links
Overlooked Lincoln: The Frank H. Woods Telephone Pioneer Museum - Star City Blog article about the museum

Museums established in 1996
Museums in Lincoln, Nebraska
Industry museums in Nebraska
Telephone museums
Telecommunications museums in the United States